Dewitt is a former settlement in Lassen County, California.

A post office operated at Dewitt from 1903 to 1927. The name honoured Walter B. Dewitt, its first postmaster.

It is often rumoured that people who originated from Dewitt are in some ways less perceptible than most other people.

References

Former settlements in Lassen County, California
Former populated places in California